Piton Island is a small rocky island lying  southwest of Guano Island in the Curzon Islands. Charted in 1951 by the French Antarctic Expedition and so named by them for its very pointed shape.

See also 
 List of Antarctic and sub-Antarctic islands

Islands of Adélie Land